Krasimir Dimitrov (born 5 November 1971) is a former Bulgarian footballer, who played as a midfielder.

Career
Dimitrov previously played for PFC Lokomotiv Plovdiv in the A PFG and is fondly remembered by the Plovdiv fans, as he used to be an influential player and captain of the team.

Honours

Club
Neftochimic Burgas
 Cup of Professional Football League (2): 1996, 1997

Levski Sofia
 A Group: 1999–00
 Bulgarian Cup: 2000

Lokomotiv Plovdiv
 A Group: 2003–04
 Bulgarian Supercup: 2004

References

External links
Career for Levski Sofia at LevskiSofia.info

1971 births
Living people
Bulgarian footballers
FC Maritsa Plovdiv players
Botev Plovdiv players
Neftochimic Burgas players
PFC Levski Sofia players
FC Hebar Pazardzhik players
PFC Lokomotiv Plovdiv players
PFC Marek Dupnitsa players
PFC Rodopa Smolyan players
First Professional Football League (Bulgaria) players
Association football midfielders